Gary Hawkins is an independent filmmaker born and raised in Thomasville, North Carolina. Hawkins has written and directed six films, including The Rough South of Harry Crews, which won an Emmy and the Corporation for Public Broadcasting’s Gold Award in 1992, and The Rough South of Larry Brown, which was picked by The Oxford American as one of Thirteen Essential Southern Documentaries and was reviewed by Variety as a “beautifully conceived documentary film.” Hawkins’s fiction screenplay DownTime was selected by The Sundance Institute for the Writer’s Lab in the winter of 2000.

Hawkins is a former a member of the directing faculty at the North Carolina School of the Arts.  he was a visiting professor at Duke University in North Carolina, teaching documentary film.

External links 
 Larry Brown (in focus) and Gary Hawkins (foreground) on the set of The Rough South of Larry Brown 

Living people
Duke University staff
People from Thomasville, North Carolina
Year of birth missing (living people)
University of North Carolina School of the Arts faculty